Presidential elections were held in El Salvador on 15 March 2009. The main candidates were Rodrigo Ávila (ARENA) and Mauricio Funes (FMLN). Funes won the election with 51.3% of the vote and became the first leftist president of El Salvador.

Candidates
The Farabundo Martí National Liberation Front nominated Mauricio Funes as its presidential candidate and Salvador Sánchez Cerén as his running mate. The Nationalist Republican Alliance nominated Rodrigo Ávila and Arturo Zablah.

The Christian Democratic Party had nominated Carlos Rivas Zamora and Merlin Peña, but withdrew the nominations on 2 February 2009 after it became apparent that they would have little chance of winning the election. The PDC did not immediately voice support for one of the other candidates.
In the same direction, the PCN, which had nominated Luis Tomás Chévez, also withdrew its candidate a couple of days later.

Opinion polls
A poll from mid September 2008 gave Funes 29.2% and Ávila 26.1%, while Tomás Chévez (PCN) got 1.9%. However, a poll from late September gave Funes 47.4% to 23.8% for Ávila. This latter poll showing Funes with a large lead is more consistent with polling from previous months.

Later polls from 2008 showed a tightening race between Funes and Ávila, with Funes retaining the lead.

Results
FMLN won the election with 51.3% of the vote, while ARENA received 48.7%, marking the first time ARENA had lost a presidential election in 20 years. Of the election, Funes said, "This is the happiest night of my life, and I want it to be the night of El Salvador's greatest hope. I want to thank all the people who voted for me and chose that path of hope and change." Ávila conceded defeat, saying that he and his party "will be a constructive opposition." An observation team from the Organization of American States said that the elections were held without any major incidents, although there were claims of Hondurans voting at a voting center in Torola, Morazán.

Several governments said that they looked forward to working with the new government, including Taiwan and the United States.

References

El Salvador
Presidential elections in El Salvador
Presidential election